

Kurt von Briesen (3 May 1886 – 20 November 1941) was a general in the Wehrmacht of Nazi Germany. He was a recipient of the  Knight’s Cross of the Iron Cross. Briesen led the 30th Infantry Division in the invasion of Poland in 1939. On 1 August 1940, Briesen was promoted to the rank of general. On 25 November 1940 he was appointed commanding general of the LII Army Corps. Briesen was killed by Soviet aircraft near Isjum on the Seversky Donets River, southeast of Kharkov, on 20 November 1941.

Awards and decorations
 Iron Cross (1914) 2nd Class (September 1914) & 1st Class (December 1914)
 Knight's Cross of the House Order of Hohenzollern with Swords (April 1918)
 Clasp to the Iron Cross (1939) 2nd Class (20 September 1939) & 1st Class (4 October 1939)
 Knight's Cross of the Iron Cross on 27 October 1939 as Generalleutnant and commander of 30. Infanterie-Division

References

Citations

Bibliography

External links
 

1886 births
1941 deaths
People from Anklam
German Army generals of World War II
Generals of Infantry (Wehrmacht)
German Army personnel of World War I
German Army personnel killed in World War II
Recipients of the Knight's Cross of the Iron Cross
People from the Province of Pomerania
Recipients of the clasp to the Iron Cross, 1st class
Reichswehr personnel
Deaths by airstrike during World War II
Military personnel from Mecklenburg-Western Pomerania